Stephanus Abraham "Stef" Blok (born 10 December 1964) is a Dutch politician serving as Minister of Economic Affairs and Climate Policy in the Third Rutte cabinet from 25 May 2021 till 10 January 2022. He is a member of the People's Party for Freedom and Democracy (VVD).

An accountant by occupation, Blok served as a member of the House of Representatives from 25 August 1998 until 23 May 2002 and from 3 September 2002 until 5 November 2012. After the election of 2010 the Leader of the People's Party for Freedom and Democracy and parliamentary leader in the House of Representatives Mark Rutte became Prime Minister in the First Rutte cabinet with Blok chosen to succeed him as parliamentary leader in the House of Representatives serving from 8 October 2010 until 20 September 2012. Following the election of 2012 Blok was asked to become Minister for Housing and the Central Government Sector in the Second Rutte cabinet taking office on 5 November 2012. Blok served as Acting Minister of Security and Justice from 10 March 2015 until 20 March 2015 following the resignation of Ivo Opstelten and ad interim Minister of the Interior and Kingdom Relations from 29 June 2016 until 16 September 2016 during a sick-leave of Ronald Plasterk.

On 27 January 2017, Minister of Security and Justice Ard van der Steur resigned to avoid a vote of no confidence, Blok was appointed to serve out the remainder of his term and subsequently resigned as Minister for Housing and the Central Government Sector the same day. He did not stand for the election of 2017 and announced his retirement. Following the resignation of Halbe Zijlstra as Minister of Foreign Affairs in the Third Rutte cabinet on 13 February 2018, Blok was nominated to succeed him taking office on 7 March 2018.

Biography

Early life
Stephanus Abraham Blok was born on 10 December 1964 in Emmeloord, now in the Province of Flevoland. After attending Stedelijk Gymnasium Leiden, he studied Business Administration at the University of Groningen from 1977 until 1983 and graduated with a Bachelor of Business Administration and an M.S. in Business Administration degree. Blok worked for ABN AMRO as a credit broker and later as a branch manager from 1989 until 1998.

He was a member of the municipal council of Nieuwkoop from 1994 to 1998.

One of his ancestors was J.F.A. Dligoor, an engineer working in Dutch East Indies (now Indonesia) in building Prijetan dam in Lamongan, East Java and who was buried in the country.

Politics
Blok served as Acting Minister of Security and Justice after the resignation of Ivo Opstelten from 10 March until 20 March 2015 while retaining his other cabinet position. He resigned as Minister for Housing and the Central Government Sector on 27 January 2017 to hold the title of Minister of Security and Justice in a full position until 26 October 2017, following the resignation of Ard van der Steur. Blok also served as Acting Minister of the Interior and Kingdom Relations from 29 June to 16 September 2016 while Ronald Plasterk underwent surgery. After his term as justice minister, Blok announced his plans to leave politics.

Following the resignation of Halbe Zijlstra as Minister of Foreign Affairs on 13 February 2018, Blok was selected to succeed him.

Controversy
In July 2018, Blok expressed criticism of multiculturalism and argued that black African migrants could not be resettled in Eastern Europe because they would be beaten up, during a meeting that was later telecast on Zembla:

"Give me an example, of a multiethnic or multicultural society, where the original population are still living as well. [...] And where there are peaceful community relations. I am not aware of any."
An audience member suggested Suriname.
"Suriname peaceful? A functioning rule of law and democracy? Courageous, this remark. So the parties in Suriname are not divided by their ethnicity? [...] I admire your optimism. Suriname is a failed state and that is very much linked to its ethnic composition.”
One audience member suggested Singapore was a successful multi-ethnic society and Blok responded that Singapore is a “small mini-country,” which is “extremely selective in its migration” and does not allow poor immigrants except "maybe for cleaning."

His remarks led to the Government of Suriname to demand an apology and the island-government of Curaçao, part of the Dutch Kingdom, to distance itself from the minister's remarks. The latter responded to the minister's remarks by stating:

  "Minister Blok's expressions are not representative of the reality in the Caribbean part of the Kingdom. On the contrary. In our view the Curacao multicultural society reflects a better picture of norms and values, such as justice, tolerance and freedom, which we share within the Kingdom."

In Suriname, both the government and the opposition opposed the idea that Suriname is a failed state due to its ethnic diversity. It prompted Chan Santokhi of the opposition Progressive Reform Party to respond:

 "That Suriname under this government has become a country that some refer to as a ‘failed state’ is not due to its multicultural composition. Suriname is faced with a lack of good governance and unrestrained corruption."

References

External links

Official
  Drs. S.A. (Stef) Blok Parlement & Politiek

|-

|-

|-

|-

|-

1964 births
Living people
Members of the House of Representatives (Netherlands)
Municipal councillors in South Holland
Ministers of Economic Affairs of the Netherlands
Ministers of Foreign Affairs of the Netherlands
Ministers of Justice of the Netherlands
Ministers of Kingdom Relations of the Netherlands
Ministers of the Interior of the Netherlands
Ministers without portfolio of the Netherlands
Dutch accountants
Dutch bankers
People from Emmeloord
People from Nieuwkoop
People from Enkhuizen
People's Party for Freedom and Democracy politicians
University of Groningen alumni
21st-century Dutch politicians